Danièle Nouy is a French public servant who served as Chair of the Supervisory Board at the European Central Bank from 1 January 2014 to 31 December 2018. In this capacity, she was regarded as the effective head of the Single Supervisory Mechanism.

Early life and education 
Nouy grew up in Brittany and later studied political science and law.

Career 
Nouy worked at Banque de France from 1976 to 1996. She later served as secretary general of the French Prudential Supervision and Resolution Authority from 9 March 2010 to 31 December 2013.

As head of the Supervisory Board, Nouy later oversaw the implementation of the Single Supervisory Mechanism. For her nomination, Mario Draghi, president of the European Central Bank, declared, “The appointment of the Supervisory Board Chair marks an important milestone as the ECB establishes a single supervisory mechanism for banks in the euro area. Mrs. Nouy brings almost 40 years of experience in banking supervision. Her appointment will allow the Supervisory Board to take up its work soon and put in place all organisational requirements with the aim of assuming our supervisory responsibilities starting on 4 November 2014.”

Other activities 
 European Investment Bank (EIB), Member of the Appointment Advisory Committee

References 

1950 births
Businesspeople from Rennes
Living people
20th-century French businesswomen
20th-century French businesspeople
Nationality missing
Officers of the Ordre national du Mérite
Officiers of the Légion d'honneur
21st-century French businesswomen
21st-century French businesspeople